Elizabeth Ryan and Eleanor Goss were the defending women's doubles champions at the U.S. National Championships, but did not compete together. Ermyntrude Harvey and Kitty McKane Godfree defeated Joan Fry and Betty Nuthall in the final, 6–1, 4–6, 6–4.

Draw

Finals

References

Women's Doubles 
US Open (tennis) by year – Women's doubles
1927 in American women's sports